The Sitara-e-Imtiaz also spelled as Sitara-i-Imtiaz, is the third-highest (in the order of "Imtiaz") honour and civilian award in the State of Pakistan. It recognizes individuals who have made an "especially meritorious contribution to the security or national interests of Pakistan, world peace, cultural or other significant public endeavours".

This award is not limited to the citizens of Pakistan, and it can also be awarded to foreign citizens based on their achievements and services done to the State of Pakistan (see Władysław Turowicz). While, it is a civilian award, it can also be awarded to military officers of the Pakistan Defence Forces worn on their uniform for recognition of their services to the country. Like other awards, it is a highly restricted and prestigious award only given to those who have done great services to the country. It is one of the most distinguished civil decorations to the civilians who have made outstanding contribution in their respected fields such as literature, arts, sports, medicine, or science, which prompted the recognition of the country on international level.

It is given to a person who has accomplished duty beyond what is assigned to him/her. To receive this honour, the individuals are expected to show eminence and be outstanding in providing excellent service in a significant field of activity beyond what they are assigned to.

For officers in the military, it is given after distinguished service, and is also the highest medal that can be awarded to those at the rank of Brigadier-General or Major-General in the (Army), Air-Commodores or Air Vice-Marshals in the (Air Force) and Commodore or Rear-Admiral in the (Navy, Coast Guard, and Marines).

The Parliament's Committee for Award and Recognition Services for State of Pakistan, selects the names of individuals and sends final report to the Prime minister of Pakistan. On advice of the Prime minister, the President organizes a colourful ceremony that is telecast and broadcast by the Pakistan Television Corporation. The award is usually given to individuals one by one and not in groups because the whole purpose of the award is to assess the recipient's individual capabilities in par excellence.

The award is a disc of golden Jasminum which stands between two and five points of the star, and is also of pure gold. The star is in the form of a five pointed star, with additional bright coloured Jasminum filling in space between points of the star. In the middle of the star, a well polished green emerald circumference fills the inside of the golden star. A smaller golden star is situated in the middle of the emerald field.

A special grade of the medal/award has larger execution of the same medal design worn as a star on the left chest. In addition, it is worn as a sash on the right shoulder, with its rosette (yellow with white (for civilians) or/ green (for military officers only) with white and yellow edge, bearing the central disc of the medal at its centre, resting on the left hip.

At the formal ceremony, both medals can be worn at the same time depending upon the individual's achievements. The medal is suspended on a ribbon, dark green colour with a light yellow and white central stripe with white edge stripes.

Grades of the Order of Imtiaz 

This award is the 3rd Grade in the Order of Imtiaz (Excellence). The four Grades in the Order of Imtiaz are:

 Nishan-e-Imtiaz (Order of Excellence)
 Hilal-e-Imtiaz (Crescent of Excellence)
 Sitara-e-Imtiaz (Star of Excellence)
 Tamgha-e-Imtiaz (Medal of Excellence).

Service Ribbon Insignia 
The ribbon for the Sitara-e-Imtiaz (Civilian) is:

 Yellow with a white centre band and a narrow Pakistan Green stripe in the middle.

The ribbon for the Sitara-e-Imtiaz (Military) is:

 White edges with Pakistan Green band on each side, two equal white stripes separated by an equal sized Pakistan Green stripe in the middle.

Recipients of Sitara-e-Imtiaz

1950s 
 Lieutenant Colonel Shaukat Syed (1959)

1960s 
 Muhammad Enamul Huq (Bangladesh) (1962)

1970s

1980s 
 Khwaja Khurshid Anwar (film music director and musicologist) (1980)
 Brig. General Mian Muhammad Afzaal CGS (Shaheed) (later Lt. General) (1980)
 Professor S. Muhib ur Rab (1980)
 Brig. Muhammad Salim (Army Medical Corps)
 Munier Choudhuri
 Ghulam Ali (Singer)
 Dr. A. R. Kemal (Economist)
 Sayed Nafees al-Hussaini (Calligrapher)
 Allama Ghulam Mustafa Qasmi ( Islamic Scholar ) 
 Maulana Shamsul Haq Afghani (1980)
 Ayub Khan Ommaya (1981)
 A.Q Mughal
 Dr. Israr Ahmed (Islamic scholar & philosopher )1981

1990s 
 Prof. Misbah-Ud-Din Shami (1990), Crystallography
Salim Mehmud (1990), significant contributions to SUPARCO
 Jansher Khan (squash player) (1993)
 Shamsul-hasan Shams Barelvi (1995)
 Group Capt Dr Muhammad Aslam Butt (PAF).
 Wazir Agha (writer)
Abdul Majid (1999), significant contributions to SUPARCO
Talib Jauhari ( poet, philosopher, Muslim scholar of Shiite sect and orator )
Munir Niazi (Poet)
 Professor Iqtedar Hussain Bhatti (1999)

2001

2002

2003

2004 
 Mr Iftikhar Ahmad, PSP, (DIG Police, Multan) (Punjab) 
 Dr. Riazul Islam (Historian)
 Professor M. Sultan Farooqui
 Professor Kazi Abdul Shakoor
 Professor Faiz Muhammad Khan

2005

2006 
 Liaquat H. Merchant (Banking Litigation, Services rendered in health and education sectors) 
 Mohammad Hussain Dadabhoy (2006)
 Dr Faiz Mohammad Khan (2006)
 Sultan Ali Allana (2006)

2007 
 Dr. A. R. Kemal
 Brig. Muhammad Mansur Aslam

2008 
 Azhar Mahmood (Federal Investigation Agency)

2009

 Brig. Ali Nasre Alam
 Brig Sohail Ahmed Qureshi
Javed Ahmed Ghamidi
 Ayesha Jalal

2010
 Rahimullah Yusufzai
 Dr. Muhammad Amjad Saqib

2011
 Rao Maaz Khalid (Car Enthusiast) 
Rear Admiral Moazzam Ilyas
 Saeed Akhtar (Portrait Painter)

2012
 Aslam Azhar (pioneer of Pakistan Television Corporation)
 Mohammad Qavi Khan
 Shaista Zaid (English newscaster - Pakistan Television Corporation))

2015
 Prof. Dr. Niaz Ahmad Akhtar (Education: Engineering & Technology)
 Dr. Asif Mahmood Jah
Masood Ashar, (Literature)
Dr. Zahid Pervaiz, (Public Service)

2016

2017

 Raees Ahmed (arts, sitar)
 Yang Wei (China)
Mustansar Hussain Tarar (travelogue writer, novelist)
 Hafeez-ur-Rehman Hoorani (Physics)
 Muhammad Iqbal (Biotechnology)
 Muhammad Aslam Noor (Mathematics)
Tariq Mahmood Fatik (Engineering)
Munir Ahmad (Engineering)
Ghulam Sarwar (Engineering)
Nadeem Ghaffar (Engineering)
Brig (R) Munawar Hussain (Engineering)
Aleem Arshad (Engineering)
Ayaz Ayub (Engineering)
Khalid Naseeruddin Shaikh (Engineering)
Nayyar Ali Dada (Engineering)
Prof. Dr. Syed Ather Enam (Medicine)
Dr Mahboob Ali (Medicine)
Dr. Eice Muhammad (Medicine)
Mrs. Shahnaz Wazir Ali (Education)
Mohammad Rasul Jan (Science)

2018 
 Zia Chishti (entrepreneur)
 Ashar Aziz 
 Saira Afzal Tarar 
 Ashtar Ausaf Ali 
 Zahid Bashir
 Shahzad Roy
Sarfraz Ahmed (cricketer)
 Shahid Afridi

2019

2020

2021

References

 
Civil awards and decorations of Pakistan
Military awards and decorations of Pakistan
Awards established in 1957
1957 establishments in Pakistan